Last Light may refer to:
Astronomical dusk, the time after sunset when the sky becomes completely dark
Last Light (film), the 1993 TV film
Last Light (novel), a 2001 novel by Andy McNab
Last Light (album), the 2007 album by Matt Pond PA
Last Light, a 2007 novel by Alex Scarrow
Metro: Last Light, a FPS-Survival horror video game by the Ukrainian 4A Games
Last Light (TV series), a 2022 dystopian drama on Stan and Peacock